Mathieu Damours (d’Amours) de Freneuse (baptized March 14, 1657 – 1696) was a seigneur in Acadia and member of the Conseil Souverain of New France. He was the son of Mathieu Damours de Chauffours and Marie Marsolet.

References

Sources

People of New France
1650s births
1696 deaths